Ķīšezers is a lake in Riga, Latvia, with primary inflow of the Jugla River. The lake is  large, it has  of average depth and reaches  at the deepest point.

References 

Geography of Riga
Lakes of Latvia